Who's a Good Boy? (Spanish: El Guau) is a 2022 Mexican comedy film written and directed by Ihtzi Hurtado. It stars Sebastian Dante, Sirena Ortiz, Adrian Vazquez and Grettell Valdez.

Synopsis 
Chema has a mission: to go out with Claudia, the new girl at his school, to lose his virginity with her before the end of the course. Will he fulfill his dream before graduation?

Cast 
The actors participating in this film are:

 Sebastian Dante as Chema
 Sirena Ortiz as Claudia
 Adrian Vazquez as Jaime
 Grettell Valdez as Gloria
 Diego Meléndez as Hugo
 Harold Azuara as Rubén
 Luisa Guzmán Quintero as Eli
 Yankel Stevan as Sebastián
 Nashla Aguilar as Ana
 Estefania Coppola
 Andrea Mextli
 Marialicia Delgado

Release 
The film was released worldwide on Netflix on November 23, 2022.

References

External links 

 

2022 films
2022 comedy films
Mexican comedy films
2020s Spanish-language films
Mexican sex comedy films
2020s Mexican films
Films about virginity
Films about teenagers
Spanish-language Netflix original films
Films about sex addiction